Saint Blaise was a physician and bishop of Sebaste, martyred in 316.

Saint Blaise may also refer to:
Saint Blaise of Amorion (died 908)
Blaise of Caesarea Cappadociae a.k.a. Blaise the Herdsman, an early martyr

Places 
In Canada:
 Saint-Blaise-sur-Richelieu, Quebec, a municipality in the province of Quebec

In France:
 Saint-Blaise, Alpes-Maritimes, in the department of Alpes-Maritimes
 Saint-Blaise, Haute-Savoie, in the department of Haute-Savoie
 Saint-Blaise-du-Buis, in the department of Isère
 Saint-Blaise-la-Roche (St. Blasien (bei Rappoltsweiler)), in the department of Bas-Rhin
 L'Hôpital-Saint-Blaise, a village and commune in the department of Pyrénées-Atlantiques
 Lentillac-Saint-Blaise, a village and commune in the department of Lot

In Germany:
 Kolleg St. Blasien a Catholic boarding school
 Otto of St. Blasien was a German Benedictine chronicler
 St Blaise, the English name for the town of Sankt Blasien, in Baden-Württemberg
 St. Blaise Abbey in the Black Forest
 St. Blaise church in Balve, in Westphalia

In Switzerland:
 Saint-Blaise, Neuchâtel, a municipality in the canton of Neuchâtel

In the United Kingdom:
 St. Blaise's Well, a well in Bromley
 St Blaise, an alternate spelling for St Blazey in Cornwall

Other uses
 St. Blaise (horse) winner of the 1883 Epsom Derby

See also
 San Blas (disambiguation)
 San Biagio (disambiguation)
 Blaise (disambiguation)
 Blasius (disambiguation)